Deshamanya Kandiah (Ken) Balendra (born 1940) is a Sri Lankan corporate leader and executive, who holds and has held many corporate positions in Sri Lanka and the region. He served as the first Sri Lankan chairman of John Keells Holdings Ltd., the largest conglomerate in the island. Currently he is the chairman of Brandix Lanka Ltd. and the South Asia Regional Fund of the Commonwealth Development Corporation.

Biography

Early life and education
Born into a well-to-do, Tamil family in Colombo, his father was a revenue inspector. He was educated at the Royal College, Colombo, where he excelled in sports. He participated in the Royalist team at the 1958 Bradby Shield Encounter, where Trinity was defeated to end their streak of six consecutive victories.

Family
He married Swyrie, a doctor, in 1969. They have a son named Krishan, who has served as the chairman of the Colombo Stock Exchange since mid-2011. Krishan was educated at INSEAD in France and the University of London.

Career
Balendra began his career in 1963 as a planter at Finlays, an independent tea and horticultural product trader. He joined John Keells Holdings in 1969 (then known as John Keell Thompson White Ltd) and following a successful stint as a tea broker he was appointed as a company director in 1974. From 1990 until his retirement from the company in 2000 he served as its chairman, the first Sri Lankan to hold the position, overseeing a period of rapid growth and diversification. He has served as chairman of the Bank of Ceylon (2000–2002), the Ceylon Tobacco Company (2003–2008), the Securities and Exchange Commission (2000–2002), the Insurance Board of Sri Lanka, and the Ceylon Chamber of Commerce.

In April 2000 Balendra was appointed as the first president of the Sri Lanka Institute of Directors. He was a director at Chevron Lubricants Lanka until his resignation in 2011, having served over 10 years.

In 2011 The Sunday Leader named Balendra as one of "The 20 Billionaires of Sri Lanka’s Stock Market". He was featured in 11th place, with holdings said to be worth nearly 2.5 billion Rupees.

Honors and recognition
Awarded the Sri Lankan national honour Deshamanya by President Chandrika Kumaratunga(1998).
Appointed Honorary Consul General of the Republic of Poland in Sri Lanka.
Awarded The Cavaliers Cross of the Order of Merit of Poland (2007).
Named Sri Lankan of the Year (1998) & voted the Most Effective Business Leader in Sri Lanka (2003) since independence in a poll conducted by the Lanka Monthly Digest magazine.

References

External links 
 Ken Balendra's Profile at PIPL

Living people
Alumni of Royal College, Colombo
Sri Lankan Tamil bankers
Sri Lankan Hindus
Sri Lankan Tamil businesspeople
1940 births
Deshamanya